Joseon Survival Period is a 2019 South Korean television series starring Kang Ji-hwan (replaced by Seo Ji-seok from episode 11 onwards), Kyung Soo-jin, Song Won-seok, Park Se-wan, Lee Jae-yoon, Han Jae-suk and Yoon Ji-min. It aired on TV Chosun from June 8 to August 17, 2019 on Saturdays and Sundays at 22:50 (KST) time slot.

Synopsis
The story of Han Jung-rok, a deliveryman who used to be a famous archer, who travels back in time to the Joseon dynasty.

Cast

Main
 Kang Ji-hwan / Seo Ji-seok as Han Jeong-rok
 Kyung Soo-jin as Lee Hye-jin
 Song Won-seok as Im Kkeokjeong
 Park Se-wan as Han Seul-gi
 Lee Jae-yoon as Jeong Ga-ik
 Han Jae-suk as Yun Won-hyeong
 Yoon Ji-min as Jeong Nan-jeong

Supporting
 Lee Kyung-jin as Queen Munjeong
 Wi Yang-ho as Wang-chi
 Jung Han-hun as Kim Soon
 Shin Yi as Kisaeng Haeng-soo
 Park Ya-sung as Dong Chan
 Yoo In-hyuk
 Yoo Joo-eun as Cho Sun

Production
The first script reading took place in March 2019.

On July 9, 2019, Kang Ji-hwan was arrested over allegations that he sexually molested and assaulted two of his agency's female employees at his home. He officially dropped out of the series on July 11 and was replaced by Seo Ji-seok from episode 11 onwards. The drama was cut off from 20 to 16 episodes.

Original soundtrack

Part 1

Part 2

Part 3

Part 4

Ratings
In this table,  represent the lowest ratings and  represent the highest ratings.

Notes

References

External links
  
 
 

Korean-language television shows
2019 South Korean television series debuts
2019 South Korean television series endings
TV Chosun television dramas
Television series set in the Joseon dynasty
South Korean fantasy television series
South Korean historical television series
South Korean time travel television series
Television series by Studio Santa Claus Entertainment